The Funfair of Besançon is a festive event who takes place every year in the Micropolis in the district of Planoise.

History
This event is the most festive gathering of Franche-Comté, and met every year more than 140.000 visitors and more than 450 exhibitors, and exist since 1936. In 2010, 20.000 visitors where attracted at the opening day.

See also
 Planoise
 Besançon

Planoise
Festivals in France
Tourist attractions in Besançon